Ținutul Dunării (or Ținutul Dunărea de Jos) was one of the ten Romanian ținuturi ("lands") founded in 1938, after King Carol II initiated an institutional reform by modifying the 1923 Constitution and the law of territorial administration. Named after the Danube River and extending over historical areas of Moldavia (into Moldavia-proper, as well as Budjak and Bessarabia), parts of Northern Dobruja (with the Danube Delta), and an area of Wallachia around Brăila. Its capital was the city of Galați. Ținutul Dunării ceased to exist following the Soviet occupation of Bessarabia and northern Bukovina and the king's abdication in 1940.

Coat of arms
The coat of arms consists of ten bars, five of azure and five of murrey, representing the former ten counties (județe) of Greater Romania (71 in total) which it included. Over the bars there is an argent bend, of wavy shape, reminding of the Danube.

Former counties incorporated
After the 1938 Administrative and Constitutional Reform, the older 71 counties lost their authority. 
 Brăila County
 Cahul County
 Covurlui County
 Fălciu County
 Ismail County
 Putna County
 Râmnicu Sărat County
 Tecuci County
 Tulcea County
 Tutova County

See also
 Historical administrative divisions of Romania
 Sud-Est (development region)
 History of Romania

External links
 Map

Bessarabia
Moldavia
Dunarii
Wallachia
1938 establishments in Romania
1940 disestablishments in Romania
States and territories established in 1938
States and territories disestablished in 1940